Monodactylidae is a family of perciform bony fish commonly referred to as monos, moonyfishes or fingerfishes. All are strongly laterally compressed with disc-shaped bodies and tall anal and dorsal fins. Unusually for fish, scales occur on their dorsal fins and sometimes on the anal fins. The pelvic fins are small, sometimes vestigial. These long, scaly fins have given them the name "fingerfishes". Most are silvery with yellow and black markings; the juveniles are especially attractive, and most species are popular as aquarium fish.

The family contains six extant species in two genera, Monodactylus and Schuettea. They are distributed along the coastlines of Africa, India, and southern Asia, and as far west as Australia. Species of Monodactylus in particular commonly occur in estuaries. They are truly euryhaline and can live in fresh water for extended periods. Moonyfishes are predators and feed primarily on smaller fish and invertebrates. They are found primarily in shallow water and form large shoals.

Two extinct species, Psettopsis subarcuatus and Pasaichthys pleuronectiformis, are known as fossils from the Lutetian lagerstatten of Monte Bolca, Eocene, in Italy.

In aquaria 

Aquarists commonly keep M. argenteus and M. sebae as pets in domestic aquaria, where they are known as monos or Malayan angels; they are also widely kept in public aquaria. They are hardy and easy to care for, but require brackish water and copious swimming space. .

External links 
 

 
Perciformes families
Taxa named by David Starr Jordan
Taxa named by Barton Warren Evermann
Extant Eocene first appearances